Iotasperma are a genus of flowering plants in the composite family Asteraceae, native to Australia. They are erect annual herbs.

Species
Currently accepted species include:

Iotasperma australiensis G.L.Nesom
Iotasperma sessilifolia (F.Muell.) G.L.Nesom

References 

Astereae
Asteraceae genera